Marcelo Aparecido Toscano (born 12 May 1985) is a Brazilian footballer who plays for Paysandu. Mainly a striker, he can also play as a winger.

Club career
Born in Areado, Minas Gerais, Toscano was a São Vicente youth graduate. Initially a forward, he was converted to a right back during his time at Paulista, mainly due to the lack of goals.

Back as a striker at Paraná, Toscano scored ten goals in 2009 Campeonato Brasileiro Série B, being the club's top goalscorer. On 20 August 2010 he moved abroad for the first time in his career, after agreeing to a four-year deal with Primeira Liga side Vitória de Guimarães.

Toscano made his debut in the main category of Portuguese football on 28 August, starting and scoring a hat-trick in a 3–1 away win against C.D. Nacional. On 21 December 2012 he rescinded his contract, and signed for Figueirense on the following day.

Toscano appeared rarely for Figueira, and subsequently joined Comercial de Ribeirão Preto. On 14 April 2014 he moved to Vila Nova, but rescinded his link only two months later.

Toscano finished the year with Cuiabá, scoring three goals in Série C. In November 2014 he joined Mirassol, and was the top goalscorer in 2015 Campeonato Paulista Série A2.

On 16 April 2015 Toscano moved to Série B side América Mineiro.

Having successfully gotten América Mineiro promoted to the Série A, Toscano signed for Jeju United FC on 7 December 2015. After one and a half seasons playing for Jeju, he transferred to Omiya Ardija in the J. League Division 1 in June, 2017. He finished his time at Jeju with 49 league appearances and 17 goals. 
 
On 29 July 2017 Toscano made his first appearance against Vissel Kobe scoring a goal on his debut however the game concluded with 3–1 away defeat. In his first season with Omiya Ardija they were relegated to Japan's second division J2 League.

On 1 January 2019 Toscano resigned with Série B side América Mineiro to a two-year contract.

On 27 December 2019 Toscano was loaned out to Mirassol until the end of December 2020.

Honours
Vitória de Guimarães
Taça de Portugal: 2012–13

References

External links

1985 births
Living people
Sportspeople from Minas Gerais
Brazilian footballers
Association football forwards
Campeonato Brasileiro Série A players
Campeonato Brasileiro Série B players
Campeonato Brasileiro Série C players
Paulista Futebol Clube players
Mirassol Futebol Clube players
União São João Esporte Clube players
Paraná Clube players
Figueirense FC players
Comercial Futebol Clube (Ribeirão Preto) players
Vila Nova Futebol Clube players
Cuiabá Esporte Clube players
América Futebol Clube (MG) players
Paysandu Sport Club players
Maccabi Ahi Nazareth F.C. players
Swiss Challenge League players
FC Lausanne-Sport players
Primeira Liga players
Vitória S.C. players
Omiya Ardija players
Brazilian expatriate footballers
Brazilian expatriate sportspeople in Israel
Brazilian expatriate sportspeople in Switzerland
Brazilian expatriate sportspeople in Portugal
Expatriate footballers in Israel
Expatriate footballers in Switzerland
Expatriate footballers in Portugal